Moussoro Airport  is a public use airport located  east-northeast of Moussoro, Bahr el Gazel, Chad.

See also
List of airports in Chad

References

External links 
 Airport record for Moussoro Airport at Landings.com

Airports in Chad
Bahr el Gazel Region